The Men's 5000 metres competition at the 2021 World Single Distances Speed Skating Championships was held on 11 February 2021.

Results
The race was started at 16:01.

References

Men's 5000 metres